Ian Ross may refer to:

 Ian Ross (playwright) (born 1968), Métis playwright
 Ian Ross (footballer, born 1947) (1947–2019), Scottish football player for Liverpool and Aston Villa, manager of Huddersfield Town
 Ian Ross (footballer, born 1974), Scottish football player for Motherwell, St. Mirren and Partick Thistle
 Ian Ross (footballer, born 1986), former Sheffield United trainee still active in non-league football
 Ian Ross (newsreader) (1940–2014), former Australian television news presenter
 Sir Ian Clunies Ross (1899–1959), Australian veterinary scientist and science administrator
 Ian Munro Ross (1927–2013), pioneer in transistors and President of Bell Labs
 Ian Ross (journalist) (born 1955), former sports journalist and author
 Ian Simpson Ross (1930–2015), Scottish academic

See also 
 Iain Ross (born 1928), Scottish rugby union player